The LvivMozArt festival is an annual international classical music festival held in Lviv and Brody, and their surroundings, in Ukraine. It is named in honor of Franz Xaver Wolfgang Mozart, son of Wolfgang Amadeus Mozart, who lived in Lviv from 1808 to 1838.

LvivMozArt combines contemporary academic music and classical pieces performed by musicians from multiple European countries, the United States and South Africa. Its last pre-pandemic edition in 2019 drew 9,500 spectators.

References 

Music festivals in Ukraine
Classical music festivals
2017 establishments
Classical music